The women's elimination race competition at the 2018 UEC European Track Championships was held on 5 August 2018.

Results

References

Women's elimination race
European Track Championships – Women's elimination race